SEAF (Small Enterprise Assistance Funds) is an international investment management group that provides growth capital and business assistance to small and medium enterprises (SMEs) in emerging and transition markets underserved by traditional sources of capital.

History 

Founded in 1989 as the private equity investment subsidiary of the international development organization CARE, Small Enterprise Assistance Funds ("SEAF") evolved in 1995 into an independent organization specializing in the sponsorship and management of investment funds targeting growth-oriented, emerging enterprises located in countries underserved by traditional sources of capital.

SEAF has managed or is managing 36 Funds across more than 30 countries with over US$1 billion in aggregate committed capital, of which over US$600 million has been invested through over 400 investments in SMEs, with more than 300 completed exits (through December 31, 2017).  Investors in SEAF-sponsored funds represent a cross section of public and private institutions, including multilateral financial institutions, private foundations, pension funds, insurance companies, family offices, banks and other independent financial institutions.

SEAF employs over 140 investment professionals worldwide within a network of 20+ regional offices.

SEAF International Funds 
Below is a list of SEAF's active and historic funds and the countries in which they operate:

Global 
 SEAF Flex Fund
 SEAF SME Debt Facility
 SEAF Global SME Fund

Central and Eastern European Funds 
 Caresbac Polska (Closed)
 Poland
 Baltics Small Equity Fund (Closed)
 Estonia
 Latvia
 Lithuania
 SEAF Macedonia (Closed)
 SEAF Macedonia II Fund
 Central/Eastern Europe Growth Fund
 SEAF Trans-Balkan Fund (Closed)
 Bulgaria through the Trans-Balkan Bulgaria Fund (Closed)
 Romania through the Trans-Balkan Romania Fund (Closed)
 Croatia through the SEAF Croatia (Closed)
 SEAF South Balkan Fund
 Serbia  
 Montenegro
 Macedonia
 Georgia Regional Development Fund
 SEAF Impact Serbia Fund
 SEAF Caucasus Growth Fund
 Armenia
 Azerbaijan
 Georgia

Latin American Funds 
 SEAF Colombia Agribusiness Fund (Dual Fund Structure)
 Trans-Andean Fund (Closed)
 Peru through the Fondo Transandino Peru Fund (Closed)
 Colombia through the Fondo Transandino Colombia Fund
 Latam Growth Fund (Closed)
 Latam Peru Fund (Closed)

Asian Fundshttp://www.seaf.com/news/If%20you%20can%20take%20the%20heat,%20invest%20in%20Afghanistan%20%7C%20Reuters.com.pdf  Reuters Report on SEAF's Work in Afghanistan 
 Central Asia Small Enterprise Fund (Closed)
 Uzbekistan
 Kazakhstan
 Kyrgyz Republic
 Tajikistan
 Turkmenistan
 Sichuan Small Investment Fund
 China
 SEAF India Investment Growth Fund (Closed)
 SEAF India Agribusiness Fund (Dual Fund Structure)
SEAF Bangladesh Ventures LLC
 SEAF Blue Waters Growth Fund Limited
 Vietnam
 Cambodia
 Afghan Growth Finance 
 Afghanistan

Impact on development 
Small and medium enterprises (SMEs) are often overlooked and therefore referred to as the "missing middle" in the developing world.  Recent data results, analysis and case highlights (reports can be found below in the "Publications" section) demonstrate how SMEs can generate employment opportunities in their local communities, serve as links to regional and international markets for smaller local suppliers, and address market deficiencies and customer needs that would otherwise go unaddressed.

SEAF and CEED 
In 2006, the SEAF family grew larger with the creation of Center for Entrepreneurship and Executive Development (CEED), a legacy institution of United States Agency for International Development (USAID) and SEAF, born out of USAID grant funding in SME equity investments made by SEAF throughout the Balkans, and EBRD in Slovenia. CEED centers provide business development training and technical assistance to entrepreneurs in emerging markets.

Leadership 
SEAF is led by a Corporate Board of Directors, an International Advisory Council, and a Management Team based in Washington, D.C. The board and the council include business leaders, editors of periodicals, academics, and other international experts. Below is a list of senior management at SEAF:

United States headquarters 
 Hubertus van der Vaart, CEO Bert van der Vaart is CEO and Co-Founder of SEAF. He has since been involved with the establishment and supervision of every SEAF fund, frequently traveling to collaborate with each SEAF fund office. Bert is a member of the SEAF Global Investment Committee
 David Mathewson, PresidentDavid joined SEAF as President in 2016. Mathewson chairs SEAF's Global Investment Committee and senior management team and supports the CEO in overseeing the strategic development and operations of SEAF.
 Donald Lubreski, Treasurer and Chief Financial OfficerDon Lubreski serves as SEAF's Chief Financial Officer, providing financial oversight of the worldwide SEAF management entity and the private equity funds and other financing vehicles it manages.
 Bob Webster, Managing Director Bob Webster is Managing Director of Impact Investing Strategy at SEAF. He has a multi-faceted role, including a position on SEAF's Global Investment Committee, ensuring that impact is embedded in every SEAF process, supporting new fund raises and launches, offering thought leadership to the impact investing space, and designing and implementing technical assistance components of SEAF funds.
 Peter Righi, Global Director – CEEDPeter Righi is a co-developer and the Global Director of the Center for Entrepreneurship and Executive Development (CEED) program which was founded by the Small Enterprise Assistance Funds (SEAF) in 2006.
 Robert Vodicka, Vice PresidentRobert's primary focus is in fund formation and operational launch efforts. Robert is leading SEAF's tech deployment efforts, bringing developed technologies to SEAF markets and companies. Robert heads SEAF's Environmental, Social and Governance efforts to ensure that all investees meet SEAF standards. Additional work includes due diligence on fund pipeline – market research, financial/operational analysis, valuation analysis, and investment structuring.

Notes and references

Organizations related to small and medium-sized enterprises